"I'm Alive" is a song by the Electric Light Orchestra (ELO), released as a single in May 1980. It is featured in a sequence near the beginning of the feature film Xanadu. The song also appears on the soundtrack album Xanadu.

Background
In the film the song is heard as the Muses emerge from a graffiti-like portrait; Olivia Newton-John, playing Kira (Terpsichore), emerges last. The film's version of the song contains a fairly lengthy instrumental introduction, a small segment of which is used for the album version.

The single's B-side, "Drum Dreams", is also featured in the film at the beginning of the Xanadu nightclub grand opening scene and segues into the movie title song; however, it does not appear on the soundtrack album.  "Drum Dreams" was also used as the B-side of the "All Over the World" single.

Reception
Cash Box said that it has "adept movement from electronically treated vocals to Lynne’s lead."  Record World said that "Keyboard magic abounds with a Beatlesque melody line & heavenly falsetto choruses."

Personnel
 Jeff Lynnelead and backing vocals, electric guitars, keyboards, synthesizers
 Bev Bevandrums, percussion
 Richard Tandypianos, synthesizers, keyboards
 Kelly Groucuttbass guitar, backing vocals
 Louis Clarkstrings

Chart performance

Weekly charts

Year-end charts

Certifications

References

1980 singles
Electric Light Orchestra songs
Song recordings produced by Jeff Lynne
Songs from Xanadu (film)
Songs written by Jeff Lynne
1980 songs
Jet Records singles
MCA Records singles